Airborne Precision Spacing has been developed by the National Aeronautics and Space Administration (NASA) over the 90's to benefit from the capabilities of the flight deck to precisely space their aircraft relative to another aircraft.

See also
Air traffic control radar beacon system
Traffic collision avoidance system
Airborne Separation Assistance System, Self-separation of aircraft, promoted by EUROCONTROL

References

Air traffic control
Aircraft collision avoidance systems
NASA